Epithelial basement membrane dystrophy (EBMD) is a disorder of the eye that can cause pain and dryness.

It is sometimes included in the group of corneal dystrophies. It diverges from the formal definition of corneal dystrophy since it is non-familial in most cases. It also has a fluctuating course, while for a typical corneal dystrophy the course is progressive.  When it is considered part of this group, it is the most common type of corneal dystrophy.

Signs and symptoms 
Patients may complain of severe problems with dry eyes, or with visual obscurations.  It can also be asymptomatic, and only discovered because of subtle lines and marks seen during an eye exam.

EBMD is a bilateral anterior corneal dystrophy characterized by grayish epithelial fingerprint lines, geographic map-like lines, and dots (or microcysts) on slit-lamp examination. Findings are variable and can change with time. While the disorder is usually asymptomatic, up to 10% of patients may have recurrent corneal erosions, usually beginning after age 30; conversely, 50% of patients presenting with idiopathic recurrent erosions have evidence of this dystrophy.

Pathophysiology 
In some families autosomal dominant inheritance and point mutations in the TGFBI gene encoding keratoepithelin have been identified, but according to the International Committee for Classification of Corneal Diseases (IC3D) the available data still does not merit a confident inclusion of EBMD in the group of corneal dystrophies. In view of this, the more accurate designation of the disease is possibly not dystrophy but corneal degeneration.

The main pathological feature of the disease is thickened, multilaminar and disfigured basement membrane of corneal epithelium. The change in the structure affects the epithelium, some cells of which may become entrapped in the rugged membrane and fail to migrate to the surface where they should undergo desquamation.

Treatment 
Phototherapeutic keratectomy (PTK) done by an ophthalmologist can restore and preserve useful visual function for a significant period of time in patients with anterior corneal dystrophies including EBMD.

See also 
 Corneal dystrophy

References

Disorders of sclera and cornea